S113 may refer to:

 SMS S113, an Imperial German Navy torpedo boat
 Scania S113, a model of Scania buses
 S113 road in Amsterdam